Kemu Valetini (born 26 August 1994) is a Fijian rugby union player, currently playing for the . His preferred position is fly-half or centre.

Early career
Valetini grew up in Melbourne, and played in the Dewar Shield for the Harlequins club. He is the brother of Australia international Rob Valetini.

Professional career
Valetini began his professional career in Melbourne with the Melbourne Rising, and trained with the full Rebels side. Following a knee injury, he moved to Spain to represent Valladolid RAC but returned due to the COVID-19 pandemic and another knee injury. In 2022, he joined Manly, where he impressed.

References

External links
itsrugby.co.uk Profile

1994 births
Living people
Australian rugby union players
Fijian rugby union players
Rugby union fly-halves
Rugby union centres
Melbourne Rising players
Fijian Drua players
Rugby union players from Melbourne